Conan: The Cimmerian is a video game that was released by Virgin Games and Synergistic Software in 1991 for Amiga and DOS.

Reception
Charles Ardai reviewed the game for Computer Gaming World, and stated that "At least, unlike most games of this ilk, Virgin has taken a stab at making Conan a creature of flesh and blood, rather than just another bunch of testosterone-tinted pixels. By letting players participate in the birth of their hero, an added layer of interest, if not actual depth, takes shape. Nietzsche it ain't, but Howard it is!"

Reviews
Compute!
Info
PC Games (Germany) - Oct, 1992
ASM (Aktueller Software Markt) - Dec, 1991

References

External links
Conan on MobyGames.com

1991 video games
Action-adventure games
Amiga games
DOS games
Synergistic Software games
Video games based on Conan the Barbarian
Video games developed in the United States